Innawonga is a small Aboriginal community  southeast of Tom Price in the Pilbara region of Western Australia, within the Shire of Ashburton.

Native title 

The community is located within the registered Yinhawangka Part A (WAD340/2010) native title claim area.

Governance 

The community is managed through its incorporated body, Innawonga Aboriginal Corporation, incorporated under the Aboriginal Councils and Associations Act 1976 on 6 February 1990.

Town planning 

Innwonga Draft Layout Plan No.1 is not yet endorsed by the community and exists only in draft format.

External links 
 Native Title Claimant application summary

Aboriginal communities in Pilbara
Shire of Ashburton